The Fate of Capua is a 1700 tragedy by the writer Thomas Southerne. In Ancient Capua the rival Roman and Cartheginian factions vie for influence.

The original cast included John Hodgson as Pacuvius Calavius, Thomas Betterton as Virginius, John Bowman as Magius, John Verbruggen as Junius and Elizabeth Barry as Favonia. The prologue was written by Charles Boyle.

References

Bibliography
 Lowerre, Kathryn. Music and Musicians on the London Stage, 1695-1705. Routledge, 2017.
 Nicoll, Allardyce. History of English Drama, 1660-1900, Volume 2. Cambridge University Press, 2009.

1700 plays
English plays
West End plays
Tragedy plays
Plays by Thomas Southerne
Plays set in ancient Rome
Plays based on actual events